Grmada (Slovene for "stake") can be:

 Grmada, the west peak of Mount Saint Mary, a hill in Ljubljana, the capital of Slovenia
 Grmada Above Krško, a hill near the city of Krško, southeastern Slovenia
 Grmada Above Ortnek, a hill in the Municipality of Ribnica, southern Slovenia
 Polhov Gradec Grmada, a hill near the settlement of Polhov Gradec, central Slovenia
 Grmada, Trebnje, a village in the Municipality of Trebnje, southeastern Slovenia